The parish of Lackagh or Lacagh is located in County Galway, Ireland, approximately halfway between Galway city and Tuam (east of a line between these two towns). It is bounded by the parishes of Athenry, Abbeyknockmoy, Corofin, Annaghdown and Claregalway. The River Clare runs through the centre of the parish.

It was once part of the kingdom of the Soghain of Connacht.

Cregmore and Turloughmore lie within the parish.

See also
 List of towns and villages in the Republic of Ireland
 Battle of Knockdoe (1504)
 River Clare

References

 Early Ecclesiastical Settlement Names of County Galway, Dónall Mac Giolla Easpaig, in Galway:History and Society, 1996, pp. 810. 
 In Their Own Words: The Parish of Lackagh-Turloughmore and its People, ed. Liz Blackmore, John Cronin, Donal Ferrie and Brid Higgins, Galway, 2001. .
 The Life, Legends and Legacy of Saint Kerrill: A Fifth-Century East Galway Evangelist, Joseph Mannion, 2004. 

Civil parishes of County Galway
Towns and villages in County Galway
Articles on towns and villages in Ireland possibly missing Irish place names